Seonggwang is a high school in Daegu, South Korea. The school was established in 1953 with its first students graduating in 1956.

References 
http://www.seonggwang.hs.kr/

Educational institutions established in 1953
High schools in Daegu
1953 establishments in South Korea
Boys' schools in South Korea